Rosston is an unincorporated community in Union Township, Boone County, in the U.S. state of Indiana.

History
A post office was established at Rosston in 1886, and remained in operation until it was discontinued in 1918. Ross was the name of the original owners of the townsite.

Geography

References

Unincorporated communities in Boone County, Indiana
Unincorporated communities in Indiana
Indianapolis metropolitan area
Populated places established in 1886
1886 establishments in Indiana